"Stopover in a Quiet Town" is episode 150 of the American television anthology series The Twilight Zone starring Barry Nelson and Nancy Malone. It originally aired on April 24, 1964.

Opening narration

Plot
A married couple, Bob and Millie Frazier, wake up in an unfamiliar house. Millie remembers only that Bob drank too much at a party the night before, and that while driving him home to Manhattan, a large shadow appeared over their car near Riverdale.

They discover that the house is mostly props. The telephone has no connection, the cabinetry is merely glued-on facing, and the refrigerator is filled with plastic food and empty cartons. They hear a girl's laughter and go outside to find the child. However, once outside, they discover that the town is deserted; not even birds are heard. They find a stuffed squirrel, knock on the door of another house, and since it is Sunday, search for help in a church, which is also vacant.  Bob rings the bell in the church's bell tower to attract attention. When no one comes, the increasingly desperate couple discovers no one is there, all the while hearing the young girl's laughter intermittently.  They find even the trees are fake.  A sudden fire on the ground reveals that the grass is papier-mâché.  They see a parked car, and find only a mannequin in the driver's seat.  Although they find keys are in the ignition, the car won't start, as there is no engine.

Millie begins to lose hope, proposing that they actually had crashed and died, and that they are in Hell.  They hear a train whistle and, eager to leave the town, rush to the train station and board the empty train. As the train leaves the station (revealed to be in "Centerville"), they begin a lighthearted conversation, vastly relieved, admitting that Millie had been drinking as well.. However, when the train soon comes to a stop again in Centerville, they realize it has only gone in a circle, and they are back where they started.

They leave the train and begin walking out of town, once again hearing a little girl's laughter.  A large shadow falls over them, and they flee, only to be scooped up by the hand of a gigantic child. The town is now revealed to be a model village with a miniature railway running around it.  The little girl's mother says, "Be careful with your pets, dear--daddy brought them all the way from Earth." At her mother's bidding, the little girl drops the couple back into the town.  Bob and Millie begin to run, apparently looking for a place to hide.

Closing narration

Uses in other media
This episode is referenced in the second verse of the Rush song "The Twilight Zone", recorded in 1976: "You wake up lost in an empty town/Wondering why no one else is around/Look up to see a giant boy/You've just become his brand new toy."

The "Child's Play" episode of the anthology TV series Hammer House of Mystery and Suspense, which aired on October 8, 1984, was inspired by this Twilight Zone episode. The plot concerns a couple (Mary Crosby, Nicholas Clay) who wake up to be trapped in a house that is suffocating them and their children via extreme heat. When they finally find a way out, it is revealed that they are lifelike android dolls inside an advanced house who malfunctioned when the house was put into the oven by the brother of a young girl, both of whom are living in the distant future.

The episode plot is also loosely seen in season one, episode 22 of Pokémon. In the episode titled "Abra and the Psychic Showdown!", Ash loses to a mysterious and dangerous psychic gym leader named Sabrina. Upon his loss, Ash, Misty, and Brock are shrunken to doll size and find themselves in Sabrina's toy model home, where Sabrina proceeds to antagonize them. Ash and his friends are only saved when Sabrina's disguised father uses his psychic abilities to teleport them back to the real world.

The episode is referenced in the sixth episode of the fourth season of the Netflix series Orange is the New Black. Inmate counselor Healy mentions the episode to the paranoid prisoner Lolly to convey that he understands that she confuses fantasy with reality in much the same way as Healy's mother did.

Lorcan Finnegan and Garret Shanley's Vivarium (2019), in which a couple played by Imogen Poots and Jesse Eisenberg becomes trapped in a deserted housing development, contains multiple references to this episode: in both, a couple is trapped in an artificial environment, ending up right back where they started when they try to get out.

References

DeVoe, Bill. (2008). Trivia from The Twilight Zone. Albany, GA: Bear Manor Media. 
Grams, Martin. (2008). The Twilight Zone: Unlocking the Door to a Television Classic. Churchville, MD: OTR Publishing.

External links

1964 American television episodes
The Twilight Zone (1959 TV series season 5) episodes
Television episodes about alien abduction
Fiction about giants